The Combined Task Force 152 or CTF-152 is a multinational naval task force, set up in 2004 to coordinate security operations in the Persian Gulf and is one of three task forces operated by Combined Maritime Forces (CMF). In July 2007 a crew from the destroyer USS O'Kane, attached to CTF-152, boarded a North Korean ship suspected of smuggling. CTF 152 cooperates with the naval and coast guard forces of different nations of the Persian Gulf region, and its command is rotated among member nations. Bahrain was the first Gulf Cooperation Council state to take command of the task force, in 2008.

Known commanders

References

External links
CTF 152 main website

 
Multinational units and formations
Naval task forces